Saint-Philippe is a commune in the French overseas department of Réunion. It is located in southeastern Reunion.

Geography
Saint-Philippe is on the highest point on the island. It borders the municipalities of Saint-Joseph and Sainte-Rose, to the west and north respectively. Although it is a coastal area, the administrative centre is in Les Hauts (the highland area of the island).

Climate

Saint-Philippe has a tropical rainforest climate (Köppen climate classification Af).

History 
A notable event in the commune's history was in 1897, when the British troopship RIMS Warren Hastings ran aground in the middle of the night. Two seamen died as a result, the crash sparked by a compass malfunction resulting from the eruption of the Piton de la Fournaise. On board the ship was some electricity, for which the village of Tremblet would have to wait until 1984 to finally receive.

Population

See also
Communes of the Réunion department
Ravine d'Ango

References

Communes of Réunion